This is a list of Honorary Fellows of Downing College, Cambridge.

 Aitzaz Ahsan
 Keith Ajegbo
 Michael Apted
 Dame Janet Baker
 Martin Baker
 Farmida Bi
 Sir Quentin Blake
 Sir Colin Blakemore
 Sir Alan Bowness
 Richard Bowring
 Godfrey Bradman
 Victoria Brignell
 Giles Brindley
 Sir Arnold Burgen
 John Cardy
 Alan Carrington
 Stephen Chambers
 Lawrence Collins, Baron Collins of Mapesbury
 Barry Everitt
 Sir Francis Graham-Smith
 Geoffrey Grimmett
 Alan Howard 
 David Ingram
 Howard Jacobson
 P. D. James, Baroness James of Holland Park
 Martin Kemp
 Sir David King
 Sir Kim Lewison
 David Lloyd Jones, Lord Lloyd Jones 
 Peter Mathias
 Sir Richard McCombe
 Wilfrid Mellers
 Keith Murray, Baron Murray of Newhaven
 Sir Trevor Nunn
 Stuart Peach, Baron Peach
 Sir John Pendry
 David Rees
 Sir Brian Vickers
 Dame Caroline Wilson
 N. T. Wright

See also 
 :Category:Alumni of Downing College, Cambridge
 :Category:Fellows of Downing College, Cambridge.

Downing College, Cambridge
Fellows of Downing College, Cambridge
Downing